Nelson Wang Xuntuo, also known as Nelson X. Wang, is a Chinese entrepreneur educated in the United States. He was elected to Forbes 30 Under 30  for his contributions in renewable energy technologies. He attended the Massachusetts Institute of Technology (MIT) where he was elected as Irwin M. Jacobs and Joan K. Jacobs Presidential Fellow. His tech start-up story was featured on People's Daily.

Biography
Wang is a Chinese entrepreneur educated in the United States. He is a Forbes 30 Under 30. He studied in Electrical Engineering and Computer Science at the Massachusetts Institute of Technology where he was elected an Irwin M. Jacobs Presidential Fellow. He also completed business minor via MBA program at Harvard Business School.

Early life
Wang was born in Xi'an, China, grew up in Shanghai with his parents, then attended the Massachusetts Institute of Technology where he was elected an Irwin Jacobs Presidential Fellow.

Honours and awards

Forbes 30 Under 30, Forbes. 
Irwin Jacobs Presidential Fellow, Massachusetts Institute of Technology 2012

References

1989 births
Living people
MIT School of Engineering alumni
Harvard Business School alumni